'''Nawada Fatehpur  is a mid-sized village located in the district of Gurgaon in the state of Haryana in India. It has a population of about 2,494 persons in around 451 households.

Nawada is  village on the NH-8 through Gurgaon. Nearby sectors include 86, 82, 81 and 87. It is also a major industrial hub, home to companies such as Minda Industries and Mindarika Pvt Ltd. Shishu Kalyan High School is also located in Nawada. Once was a village of and that's the ''fatehpur''that is the complete name of this semi urban village.

References 

Villages in Gurgaon district